The 1997 24 Hours of Le Mans was the 65th Grand Prix of Endurance, and took place on 14 and 15 June 1997.

The race saw the first of a record (as of 2022) 9 wins at Le Mans for popular Danish driver Tom Kristensen.

Pre-race
The Dunlop chicane was modified slightly in order to slow speeds again but also accommodate larger gravel traps as runoff area for the protection of motorcycle riders using the Bugatti Circuit. Frenchman Sébastien Enjolras lost his life in a pre-qualifying accident in his Welter Racing WR LM97-Peugeot.

Race
The 1997 race was won by the same chassis as had won in 1996, marking the second time that Joest had won back-to-back Le Mans with the same chassis (previously done in 1984 and 1985).  They were able to beat factory teams in the GT1 and LMP classes from Porsche, BMW and Nissan.  The TWR-Porsche  was not the fastest on track during the race, but was able to take advantage of the leading Porsche 911 GT1's and McLaren F1 GTR's mechanical problems, allowing the Joest Racing machine to claim victory by one lap.

Official results

Statistics
 Pole Position - #7 Joest Racing - 3:41.581
 Fastest Lap - #7 Joest Racing - 3:45.068
 Distance - 4909.6 km
 Average Speed - 207 km/h
 Highest Trap Speed — Porsche GT1-Evo - 326 km/h (qualifying)

Le Mans
24 Hours of Le Mans
24 Hours of Le Mans races